The Hot Shoe is a 2004 documentary film which also reveals the history and development of card counting. Director David Layton interviewed current and former card counters, including members of the MIT Blackjack Team, casino employees and gambling authors and combined it with behind-the-scenes footage of casino surveillance rooms and the MIT team preparing to hit the tables. Layton learned how to count cards and gambled with $5,000 of the film's budget as a "case study." The film reviews the mathematical aspects of card counting and key elements for winning blackjack.

Blackjack players interviewed for The Hot Shoe include:

Ian Andersen
Andy Bloch
Anthony Curtis
Peter Griffin
Tommy Hyland
Max Rubin
Ralph Stricker
Edward Thorp
Olaf Vancura
Stanford Wong

References

2004 films
Films about blackjack
American documentary films
2000s American films